Virata was a kingdom ruled by the Matsya king by the name Virata. It was here that the Pandavas spent their 13th year of anonymity (Agyata Vasa) after their 12 years of forest-life (Vana Vasa) in the forests of Kamyaka and Dwaita. It was also known as Virata Nagari, modern Bairat in the Jaipur district of Rajasthan. Akhnoor, a town in Jammu and Kashmir is also considered by some as the Virat Nagar.  Upaplavya was another city in this kingdom where the Pandavas and their allies camped before the beginning of the great Kurukshetra War.

King Virata and his sons took part in the great war  and perished. Virata's daughter Uttara married Arjuna's son Abhimanyu and gave birth to Parikshit  who later became the Kuru king after the reign of the Pandavas.
Buddhanagar:  Archaeological survey in 1960 also found ruins of a temple estimated to be built around the 1st century BCE, around the time of the Mahabharat.

See also 
 Matsya Kingdom
 Kingdoms of Ancient India

References 

Mahabharata of Krishna Dwaipayana Vyasa, translated to English by Kisari Mohan Ganguli

	
Ancient empires and kingdoms of India
Kingdoms in the Mahabharata